Dušan Knežević (born January 13, 1980) is a Serbian former professional basketball player.

References
Covjek i dalje igra u BiH za Okk Drina Princip iz Zvornika

External links
 Dušan Knežević at bgbasket.com
 Dušan Knežević at Eurobasket.com
 Dušan Knežević at FIBA.com
 Dušan Knežević at aba-liga.com
 Dušan Knežević at bubabasket.com
 Dušan Knežević at balkanleague.net

1980 births
Living people
Basketball players from Belgrade
Basketball League of Serbia players
Serbian men's basketball players
ABA League players
KK Mašinac players
KK Lions/Swisslion Vršac players
KK Tamiš players
KK Iva Zorka Šabac players
KK Srem players
Centers (basketball)
Serbian expatriate basketball people in France
Serbian expatriate basketball people in North Macedonia
Saint-Quentin Basket-Ball players